Kudos is a career planning  computer program used mostly in schools for young people deciding on their career choices and what qualifications they may need for particular career paths. It is designed primarily for use in the United Kingdom, and is used by public and government-operated schools. It is aimed at students aged 13–20 years. The Kudos software is available online formats. It is one of a range of career resources produced by CASCAiD, a Loughborough University company.

Overview
Young people answer a set of 50 questions, followed by a further 67 questions should the user wish to do so. The responses for each question could be one of five answers: dislike very much, dislike, does not matter, like and like very much. This will then give the person a list of careers that match their preferences from the questions. They can then click on these careers and it will enable them to look at the aspects of the career and the qualifications needed for it.

References

External links
 KUDOS Product Information

Career advice services
Career development in the United Kingdom
Loughborough University
Science and technology in Leicestershire
School counseling
Youth employment